Stiefenhofen is a municipality  in the district of Lindau in Bavaria in Germany and the seat of the administrative community of Stiefenhofen.

Geography

Location
Stiefenhofen is located in the region of Allgäu , more precisely in the Westallgäu , near Lake Constance. The lowest point of the area is 750 m, the highest point is 1067 m.

Population

Politics

Mayor
The mayor has been Anton Wolf (CSU / free voters) from 1990 until 2020. He was re-elected in 1996, 2002, 2008 and 2014. In March 2020 Christian Hauber was elected mayor.

Town Council
After the 2014 election, the municipal council has 12 members.

Coat Of Arms
The coat of arms of the municipality of Stiefenhofen, which was assigned in 1973, is diagonally divided from silver and blue. It shows an oblique black stepped bar, below a golden bird (crossbill).

Economy

Economy including agriculture and forestry
According to official statistics, there were 89 employees subject to social insurance in the manufacturing sector in 1998. In other economic areas, 80 persons were required to work under social insurance at the place of work. In total there were 562 employees subject to social insurance. In the manufacturing sector, there were five farms and eight in the construction industry. In addition, there were 110 agricultural holdings in 1999, with 1966 hectares of cultivated green space. In 2017, the municipality reported 105 farms.

Education
Facilities (as of 1999):
 Kindergarten: 50 kindergartens with 49 children
 Primary school: one with four teachers and 87 pupils

Tourism
Monuments in Stiefenhofen

Gallery

References

Lindau (district)